The International Ornithological Committee (IOC) recognizes these 366 hummingbird species in family Trochilidae, and distributes them among 112 genera. One extinct species known only from a 19th century specimen, Brace's emerald, is included. This list is presented in IOC taxonomic sequence and is also sortable alphabetically by common name and binomial name.

References

H
'hummingbird